Verkhnyaya Vereya is a rural locality (a selo) under the administrative jurisdiction of the work settlement of Vilya in jurisdiction of the town of oblast significance of Vyksa in Nizhny Novgorod Oblast, Russia.

The village largely burned down on July 29, 2010 due to the wildfires which broke out across European Russia.  All 341 houses were destroyed; 580 people were evacuated to nearby Vyksa.

References

Rural localities in Nizhny Novgorod Oblast
Vyksa Urban Okrug
Melenkovsky Uyezd